Doe Maar was a Dutch ska band with punk and reggae influences whose career peaked from 1978 to 1984. They are one of the most successful pop bands in Dutch history. 'Doe maar' translates as go ahead or just do it.

History

Early years and debut album
Doe Maar was formed in 1978 by Ernst Jansz (CCC Inc., The Slumberlandband). Piet Dekker, with whom Jansz played in The Slumberlandband (1975) and The Rumbones (1977), introduced him to Jan Hendriks and Carel Copier in the spring of 1978 at the farm of Gé van de Donk, who later became their sound engineer. Recordings from this meeting exist on which they played, without any rehearsal, all the Dutch-language songs Jansz had written at that time.
Copier came up with the idea of the name after hearing the never officially recorded song "Doe maar". When Jansz was asked to form the resident band of that year's Festival of Fools, he added five more members to the band: singers Truus de Groot (later Nasmak), Anouk Strijbosch, Wim van Oevelen (the band's eventual tour manager), and clowns Mart de Corte and Jan Bogaerts.

Afterwards, the 9-piece line-up was reduced to the original four: Ernst Jansz (keyboards, sax, percussion), Jan Hendriks (guitar), Carel Copier (drums), and Piet Dekker (bass).

Dekker turned out to be a songwriter as well. One of his songs appeared in 1979 on a sampler album titled Uitholling overdwars, made up of new Dutch-language bands. The band also released their self-titled debut album on the Telstar label, omitting the sampler track "Blozen" ('blushing'); along with the ska and reggae influences in "Hé hé", "Als de morgen komt" ('when morning comes'), "Regen" ('rain'), "Je liet me staan" ('you left me'), and "Er verandert nix" ('nothing really changes'), which became their trademark sound, there were also punk, rock 'n' roll, and calypso influences on this first album. The critics weren't impressed.

"I fail to see how this lot will make a positive contribution to the future of Dutch music" — Muziek , January 1980

Entering the new decade, Doe Maar hit the bubbling-under charts with the Caribbean/Indonesian flavoured "Ik zou het willen doen" ('I'd like to do it'), and the album sold 2000 copies. But it wasn't enough; Dekker left after falling out with Jansz. The band seriously considered splitting up, but not before finishing their spring tour. Joost Belinfante, a multi-instrumantalist with whom Jansz used to play in CCC Inc. and Slumberlandband, took over for the time being.

Skunk
After completing their spring tour, the members of the band decided that they wouldn't split up. Jansz asked Henny Vrienten, a professional musician and composer who had previously collaborated with Jansz, if he would join the band. Vrienten initially refused as he felt it wasn't advantageous to his career, but later changed his mind. Vrienten would eventually contribute to three songs on Doe Maar's second album Skunk: "32 jaar" ('32 years'), "Smoorverliefd" ('madly in love'), and "De laatste X" ('the last time').

Skunk was initially supposed to come out in December 1980, but Telstar postponed the album's release until March 1981, as the company did not believe that Doe Maar's efforts would survive amidst bigger names during the December period. Despite this, Telstar began to market the album and released samples to radio stations. Due to a miscommunication, DJs did not know that the record had not been released, and played the samples on the radio.

Listeners responded positively to "32 jaar", although the original name of the song, "Sinds 1 dag of 2" ('since a day or two'), didn't stick and was difficult to remember. For this reason, Dutch radio DJ Frits Spits renamed it to the eventual title, "32 jaar".
The song reached #29 in the Top 40, and Skunk eventually reached #1 on the Dutch Top 100 Albums. Thanks to this success, the band played a lot of concerts, although attendance was not as high as they desired. Despite having been replaced by Vrienten, Belinfante regularly joined and performed with the band, playing trombone and percussion.

Doris Day and breakthrough
Carel Copier suffered from a torn muscle which basically ended his career. Searching for a replacement, the band recruited René van Collem, a seaside bartender who had previously released a single as a member of the band Steam. He joined in time to record the third album, of which the title track, "Doris Day", was a complaint against TV boredom. The song initially had a reference to the legendary movie program host Simon van Collem, until it was discovered that he was in fact René's father. Vrienten's other efforts dealt with subjects such as unhappy marriages ("Is dit alles", 'is this all'), failure to quit cigarettes, alcohol and junk food ("OK"), and desperately searching for a warm embrace ("Radeloos", 'desperate'). Jansz delivered songs about girls rejecting him ("Situatie", 'situation'), spending the night with him at a young age ("Belle Helene", on which he played the sax solo himself), or being too experienced ("De eerste keer", 'the first time'). With Belinfante, he co-wrote "Nachtmerrie op hol" ('nightmare on the loose'), about dreams of revisited exams.

In early 1982, Doe Maar were still playing to below-capacity crowds, but that all changed after the March release of the album Doris Day, which became a No.1 hit. Regular television appearances and sellout gigs all over the country, mainly attended by teenagers, made Jansz and Vrienten, already in their 30s, the ultimate pop idols. They enjoyed the success, but van Collem's heroin addiction was seen as a problem by the other band members; they therefore decided to replace him with Jan Pijnenburg. However, Pijnenburg made one television appearance in May before he was hurt in a car crash. Van Collem came back while his successor spent the next six months recovering. On 31 May, Doe Maar opened a sunny edition of Pinkpop; Belinfante still joined them from time to time, improvising lead vocals on the crowd-favourite "Nederwiet" ('Dutch weed').

Doe Maar's newfound success continued with "Is dit alles", and gave rise to the Nederpop (New Dutch Wave) explosion: (relatively) young bands singing in their own language at a time when it was considered unfashionable to do so, much to Jansz's concern.

In October, Doe Maar made their second appearance at Flaterpop, an indoor festival celebrating contemporary Dutch-language music, and they headlined the first edition of the live broadcast of Veronica's Rocknight following English-language groups Vitesse and Golden Earring. Belinfante was available for the event, and a few hours into his 36th birthday, he launched the jam session by singing "Nederwiet".

By the end of 1982, Doe Maar notched up their first number 1 hit with "De bom" ('the bomb'), a composition by Jansz with the underlying message "what's the point of making a career or doing your homework when the (atomic) bomb can drop at any moment?"

Virus and overexposure
In January 1983, Pijnenburg finally rejoined the band, although he spent a few more months walking on crutches. After a warm-up tour, they taped a TV special previewing tracks off their soon-to-be-released album 4us (creative spelling for Virus), which was recorded before van Collem's departure from the band. The album was released in March and featured three singles, all written by Vrienten: the second no.1 hit, "Pa" (about a father/son dispute), "1 Nacht Alleen" ('one night alone', notable for its second verse of namechecking girls who prevented Vrienten from having a deserved rest), and "Nachtzuster" ('nightnurse'), which was also included in the TV special.

Meanwhile, the band stopped enjoying their success and took a few months off from interviews and radio/television appearances.
This decision backfired, as Doe Maar mania grew even bigger.

International tours
In September 1983, Doe Maar embarked on their first proper tour of Belgium with a surprise performance at Flaterpop (9 October) thrown in for good measure. Jansz released his debut novel Gideon's droom which was based on an East-West theme. Vrienten recorded his first Dutch-language solo album (Geen ballade, 'no ballad', released in March 1984) with help from his friends. All Doe Maar members played on the closing instrumental "Amstel Hotel 13:00".

The band rounded off the year by touring the Netherlands Antilles. In between shows on Aruba, Curaçao, and Sint Maarten, they recorded a new single, "Macho", with the b-side "Grote broer" ('big brother', referring to the novel 1984), which was released in January 1984 and peaked at No.12.

Breakup
In February 1984, Doe Maar went into the studio to record their fifth album; however, the band couldn't get into the recording, and during a crisis meeting on 13 February they decided to call it a day. The split was officially announced three days later after a newspaper leak. The 8 o'clock news spoke of "weeping teenage girls who couldn't believe that it was all over".

Shocked by their fans' responses, Doe Maar played two farewell concerts at the Maaspoort in Den Bosch on 14 April. Both shows were broadcast live on radio and television and featured special guest appearances. During the matinee, which didn't sell out, Herman Brood and Belgian musician Jean Blaute joined the band for the first live performance of Vrienten's duet with Brood, "Als je wint" ('when you're a winner'; a song about success and so-called friends). During the evening, the previous lineups were briefly revived while Belinfante performed a special version of "Nederwiet" with improvised lyrics about birds and fish. "De laatste keer" proved to be a fitting closer.

The farewell concert was first re-released in 1995 on CD and VHS at Free Record Shop only, and is now available on DVD.

Solo projects
 Ernst Jansz continued working with Jan Hendriks as members of the reformed CCC Inc. and Boudewijn de Groot's touring band. He released four solo albums, including De overkant ('the other side', after his second novel), Molenbeekstraat ('Molenbeek street') and Dromen van Johanna ('Visions of Johanna') featuring translations of Bob Dylan-songs.
 Henny Vrienten became a composer of film, TV, and musical soundtracks. He released four more solo albums between 1991 and 2019. In 2016 he formed the supergroup Vreemde Kostgangers with Golden Earring guitarist George Kooymans and Boudewijn de Groot; they released two albums and toured until March 2020.
 Joost Belinfante continued to work with both Jansz and Vrienten and remained involved in short-lived projects. In 1997 he released his second solo album, Als een rivier ('like a river'), also the first without any involvement from the Doe Maar members.
 René van Collem joined funk/disco band Spargo for their modestly successful swansong album Step by Step, which was released shortly before Doe Maar played their farewell shows. In 1985, van Collem continued with the established trio Powerplay; in true "history repeats" style, he was soon replaced by Pijnenburg. In the 1990s and 2000s, van Collem drummed in several bands including the critically acclaimed Sjako. In 2014, he released his book Heroine, godverdomme ('heroin, goddamn'), named after the "Virus" song inspired by his long-time drug battle. He works with teenage addicts when not performing.

A shaky tribute
In preparation for fresh Doe Maar tracks, a tribute album was released. Trillend op m'n benen ('shaky legs') featured covers stripped from the ska/reggae angle. The re-released "32 jaar" appeared in both Dutch and English (phonetically translated as "Tastes of Sweet Desire"). Belgian group dEUS sampled "Da Da I Love You" by German three-piece Trio for their version of "Pa", but permission came too late to have it included on the Dutch release. Only reggae/rap trio Postmen, also signed to V2, stayed close to the original with their version of "De bom". Rapper/funnyman Def Rhymz lightened up this doom-laden track with some nonsense lyrics. It was released as a single and became a top 10 hit in early 2000.

Dutch dance music producer Jonathan Joosten sampled "De bom" for a dance version he titled "Tha Bomb". During a try-out concert prior to the reunion concerts, he handed a demo to manager Frank van der Meijden. Original author Jansz approved the sample but the original record company and its licensee at the time didn't. The song was pitched to radio 3FM, where it was picked up by radio DJ Rob Stenders just days before the reunion concerts started. After two weeks, the song was placed on the station's playlist, though no record was released. The official release of the song, on Digidance label Paella, contains an insertion of the sample replayed by studio musicians Bert Meulendijk (guitar), David de Marez Oyens (bass), and with vocals by Johnny Kelvin and Addy van der Zwan. Rumour has it that there was a white-label 12" record that did contain the original sample, which was spread amongst Dutch DJs. Sales of the single dropped after record shops noted the single was different from the version played on radio, but it did peak on Dutch dance charts.

Klaar: older and wiser
In February 2000, Doe Maar issued two singles on the same day: Vrienten's "Als niet als" ('If, not when') featuring rapper Brainpower, and Jansz' anti-violence track "Watje" ('wimp'), which scored a No.9 position in the Dutch Top 40. An album, Klaar ('done'), followed in April; van Collem guested on five tracks while Belinfante was replaced by a three-piece horn section. Vrienten's lyrics dealt with issues like growing older, and ladies' man Jansz had grown up. Hendriks performed his one lead vocal in "De kater" ('the hangover'), a song by Vrienten with a "let's drink our worries away and face the consequences later" theme.

Klaar was released in April 2000 and instantly went Gold.

Hees van Ahoy: hoarse throats
Due to overwhelming ticket demand, the three reunion concerts expanded to a 25-date tour; 8 warm-up shows in both the Netherlands and Belgium, 16 nights at the Ahoy, and 1 at the Sportpaleis Antwerp. The tour was a success and it was recorded for the live CD/DVD Hees van Ahoy, released in November 2000.

More reunions
Boudewijn de Groot's 2004 album Eiland in de Verte ('distant island') features one song with Jansz, Vrienten, and Hendriks.

In 2007, the entire band attended the premiere of Doe Maar: The Musical, for which Vrienten did supervising work.

Against anyone's expectations, Doe Maar played eight shows in 2008 with Belinfante as the fifth man; four club dates (June), a three-night residency at Rotterdam's Feijenoord Stadium (11 July 12, 13), and a performance at Belgium's brand new Werchter Boutique festival. Vrienten was quoted as saying "This is not a reunion, we're back together".

2012–2021
In September 2012, Doe Maar released the 2-CD Versies/De Limmen Tapes featuring rerecordings of their classic songs plus a brand new track co-written with singer-translator Jan Rot, who appeared in the musical. Versies ('versions') consists of rap collaborations produced by Postmen's Remon 'The Anonymous Mis' Stotijn. In October, the band staged a few try-outs for their headlining slot at the Symphonica in Rosso concert series; van Collem was back on drums, replacing Pijnenburg, who had moved to Spain.

In early 2013, Doe Maar embarked on the Glad IJs tour. In 2016, they celebrated the 32nd anniversary of their breakup and released a Dutch translation of 54-46 That's My Number with reggae singer Kenny B. In 2017, the band played a few festival dates, including BLØF's annual Concert At Sea.

In 2018, they launched a 40th-anniversary tour.

In 2021, the band was scheduled to play at the Down the Rabbit Hole festival as a warm-up for their fall tour. Both were cancelled; the former because of the COVID-19 pandemic, the latter due to Vrienten's illness.

Discography

Studio albums

|-
|style="text-align: left;"|Doe Maar (nl)||1979||-|| || ||
|-
|style="text-align: left;"|Skunk (nl)||1981||27 June 1981||1(3wk)||56||
|-
|style="text-align: left;"|Doe de dub – Discodubversie (nl)||1982||-|| || ||
|-
|style="text-align: left;"|Doris Day en andere stukken (nl)||1982||27 March 1982||1(3wk)||59||
|-
|style="text-align: left;"|4us (nl)||1983||26 March 1983||1(5wk)||21||
|-
|style="text-align: left;"|Lijf aan lijf (nl)||1983||12 November 1983||22||14||style="text-align: left;"|Live album
|-
|style="text-align: left;"|5 jaar Doe Maar, Het complete overzicht||1984||-|| || ||style="text-align: left;"|Compilation album / #5 in the TV LP Top 15
|-
|style="text-align: left;"|De beste van Doe Maar (LP)||1984||-|| || ||style="text-align: left;"|Compilation album
|-
|style="text-align: left;"|De beste van Doe Maar (CD)||1987||-|| || ||style="text-align: left;"|Compilation album/ #36 in the CD Top 40
|-
|style="text-align: left;"|De beste||1991||1 June 1991||2||38||style="text-align: left;"|Compilation album
|-
|style="text-align: left;"|Het complete hitoverzicht||1994||22 October 1994||39||11||style="text-align: left;"|Compilation album
|-
|style="text-align: left;"|Het afscheidsconcert – Live in de Maaspoort 's-Hertogenbosch||1995||-|| || ||style="text-align: left;"|Live album (recorded 14 April 1984)
|-
|style="text-align: left;"|Het allerbeste van Doe Maar||1999||13 November 1999||53||3||style="text-align: left;"|Compilation album
|-
|style="text-align: left;"|Alles||1999||4 December 1999||5||38||style="text-align: left;"|Compilation album
|-
|style="text-align: left;"|Klaar (nl)||2000||22 April 2000||1(5wk)||22||
|-
|style="text-align: left;"|Hees van Ahoy||2000||18 November 2000||10||8||style="text-align: left;"|Live album
|-
|style="text-align: left;"|Hollands glorie||2004||-|| || ||style="text-align: left;"|Compilation album
|-
|style="text-align: left;"|Écht alles||2007||11 February 2007||12||24||style="text-align: left;"|Compilation album
|-
|style="text-align: left;"|De singles||2008||28 June 2008||9||14||style="text-align: left;"|Compilation album
|-
|style="text-align: left;"|De doos van Doe Maar||2012||22 September 2012||25||6||style="text-align: left;"|DVD and CD box
|-
|style="text-align: left;"|Versies/Limmen tapes||2012||22 September 2012||9||9||style="text-align: left;"|Doe Maar and various performers
|-
|style="text-align: left;"|Symphonica in Rosso (nl)||2012||8 December 2012||1||6||style="text-align: left;"|Live album
|}

Other albums

|-
|style="text-align: left;"|Uitholling overdwars||1979||-|| || ||style="text-align: left;"|Various performers
|-
|style="text-align: left;"|De gevestigde orde||1982||-|| || ||style="text-align: left;"|Various performers
|-
|style="text-align: left;"|Een gebaar||1983||-|| || ||style="text-align: left;"|Various performers, for Amnesty International
|-
|style="text-align: left;"|Trillend op m'n benen – Doe Maar door anderen||2000||29 January 2000||33||6||
|-
|style="text-align: left;"|Doe Maar! De popmusical||2007||3 March 2007||26||12||
|}

Trillend op mijn benen is a tribute album featuring: Bløf, Postmen feat. Def Rhymz, Rowwen Hèze, Skik, Trijntje Oosterhuis, Caesar, Prodigal Sons, Grof Geschut, Daryll-Ann, Abel, Heideroosjes, Marcel de Groot, Bob Fosko, and Osdorp Posse.

Doe Maar! De Popmusical, with the subtitle Met de hits van Henny Vrienten en Ernst Jansz, contains songs from the musical performed by: Daniël Boissevain, Kim-Lian van der Meij, Lenette van Dongen, Jan Rot, Annick Boer, Jan Elbertse, Dorien Haan, and Bart Rijnink.

Singles

|-
|style="text-align: left;"|"Ik zou het willen doen"||1979||9 February 1980||tip11||-||
|-
|style="text-align: left;"|"Sinds 1 dag of 2 (32 jaar)"||1980||13 June 1981||29||5||
|-
|style="text-align: left;"|"Smoorverliefd"||1981||26 September 1981||tip12||-||
|-
|style="text-align: left;"|"Doris Day"||1982||27 March 1982||9||9||
|-
|style="text-align: left;"|"Is dit alles"||1982||12 June 1982||9||8||
|-
|style="text-align: left;"|"De bom"||1982||6 November 1982||1(5wk)||13||
|-
|style="text-align: left;"|"Pa"||1983||26 February 1983||1(2wk)||9||style="text-align: left;"|Alarmschijf
|-
|style="text-align: left;"|"1 nacht alleen"||1983||4 June 1983||11||6||
|-
|style="text-align: left;"|"Macho"||1984||4 February 1984||12||6||style="text-align: left;"|Alarmschijf
|-
|style="text-align: left;"|"Sinds 1 dag of 2 (32 jaar)"||1991||1 June 1991||13||8||
|-
|style="text-align: left;"|"Als niet als"||2000||8 April 2000||31||2||style="text-align: left;"|With Brainpower & Def P
|-
|style="text-align: left;"|"Watje"||2000||8 April 2000||9||8||
|-
|style="text-align: left;"|"De bom"||2007||24 February 2007||tip19||-||
|}

External links

  
 
 

Dutch reggae musical groups
Dutch ska groups
Dutch rock music groups
Musical groups established in 1978
Musical groups disestablished in 1984
Musical groups reestablished in 2000
Musical groups disestablished in 2021
1978 establishments in the Netherlands
2021 disestablishments in the Netherlands